CSNZ may refer to:

 Chartered Secretaries New Zealand, the New Zealand division of the Institute of Chartered Secretaries and Administrators
 Chico Science & Nação Zumbi, a Brazilian rock band formed by Chico Science
 Counter-Strike Nexon: Studio, formerly Counter-Strike Nexon: Zombies a 2014 video game by Valve